The 1984–85 Serie A season heralded Hellas Verona's first and so far only Scudetto.  Unusually, none of the big three of Juventus, Milan or Internazionale managed to finish in the top two. Ascoli, Lazio and Cremonese all were relegated to Serie B. Italy had one more place from the UEFA ranking.

It was the only season when referees were assigned to matches by way of a random draw instead of being assigned to a specific match by a special commission of referees ('designatori arbitrali'). After the betting scandal of the early 1980s (the 'calcioscommesse' scandal) it had been decided to clean up the image of Italian football by assigning referees randomly instead of picking them, in order to clear up all the suspicions and accusations.

Teams
Atalanta, Como and Cremonese, all from Lombardy, had been promoted from Serie B.

Final classification

Results

Top goalscorers

Footnotes

References and sources
 Almanacco Illustrato del Calcio - La Storia 1898-2004, Panini Edizioni, Modena, September 2005

External links
 :it:Classifica calcio Serie A italiana 1985 - Italian version with pictures and info.
  - All results on RSSSF Website.

Serie A seasons
Italy
1984–85 in Italian football leagues